Gaadi is a 2019 Sri Lankan Sinhala historical road film directed by Prasanna Vithanage. It is co-produced as a Sri Lankan-Indian joint production by H.D. Premasiri, Sandya Salgado for Film Island, Prasanna Vithanage Productions and Alan McAlex and Ajay Rai for Mumbai-based Jar Pictures, an Indian motion picture production company. It stars Sajitha Anthony with debut actress Dinara Punchihewa in lead roles along with Shyam Fernando and Ravindra Randeniya. Music composed by K.

It is a period drama set in 1814, during the last days of the Kandyan Kingdom. The story revolves around the journey of Tikiri who was stripped from nobility and forcibly married to an outcast by the monarchy.

Gaadi premiered on 8 October 2019 at the 24th Busan International Film Festival amidst stellar reviews. The film has been selected one of the 100 Asian films that audiences should watch by International Film Festival 2019.

In January 2020, the film won a Special Jury Award at 18th International Dhaka Film Festival.

Plot
Stripped of her Radala cast and forcibly married to an outcast by the monarch, a woman fights to keep her dignity by rejecting to succumb to her destiny.

Cast
 Sajitha Anthony as Vijaya 
 Dinara Punchihewa as Tikiri
 Ravindra Randeniya as Ehelepola Adigar
 Shyam Fernando as Bulathgama Disawe
 Iranganie Serasinghe as Bulathgama Disawe's mother
 Damayanthi Fonseka as Bulathgama Disawe's sister
 Mohamed Adamaly as John Doyle
 Ananda Kumara Unnehe as Ukkuwa
 Nethalie Nanayakkara as Ukkuwa's mother
 Kalana Gunasekara as Village youth
 Thusitha Laknath
 Jayabalan
 Mervyn Croon
 Dishni Rajapaksa
 Denuwan Sri Bandara as Soldier

International Screenings
 24th Busan International Film Festival in South Korea on 8 October 2019.
 3rd I South Asian Film Festival - San Francisco on 9 November 2019.
 21st Kerala International Film Festival on 9 December 2019.
 18th Pune International Film Festival on 10 January 2020.
 18th Dhaka International Film Festival on 19 January 2020.
 49th International Film Festival Rotterdam on 26 January 2020.
 3rd Independent Film Festival of Chennai on 9 February 2020.
 Vesoul International Film Festival on 13 February 2020.
 Bengaluru International Film Festival on 28 February 2020.

Awards
18th Dhaka International Film Festival (Best Film - Special Jury Mention)
3rd Independent Film Festival of Chennai (Emerald Dove Award)
 14th Asia Pacific Screen Awards: Cultural Diversity Award (UNESCO)

References

External links
 

2010s Sinhala-language films
Films set in the Kandyan period
Films directed by Prasanna Vithanage
Films produced by Prasanna Vithanage
Films with screenplays by Prasanna Vithanage
Films scored by K (composer)